Elizabeth Hart may refer to:
Beth Hart (born 1972), American singer
Betsy Hart (born c. 1963), American columnist
Betty Harte (1882–1965), American actress
Eliza Hart Spalding (1807–1851), American Presbyterian missionary, wife of Henry H. Spalding
Elizabeth Anna Hart (1822–1890), British poet and novelist
Elizabeth Hart, experimental musician from the band Psychic Ills